Rower Błażeja (eng. Błażej's Bike) was a live Polish youth show broadcast on TVP from 1997 until June 2004, Monday through Friday. It was the first young adult show in post-communist Poland.
The show featured discussions with invited guests and celebrities on topics related to contemporary youth. It also included live band performances, sports, culture and other serial blocks as well as Internet chat with the audience.

Presenters 
The hosts of the program were young journalists, often still attending high school.

 (1997-2001)
Marcin Kolodynski (1997-2001)
Michal Paciorkowski (1997-2000)
Cyprian Ziabski (1997-2002)
Katarzyna Dydo (1997-2002)
Katarzyna Dukaczewska (1997-2002)
Tomasz Nastaj (1999-2000)
Dorota Szelagowska (1997-2002) 
Emilia Sobczynska-Ziabska (1999-2002)
Maciej Samborski (1999-2002) 
Monika Mroziewicz (2002-2004)
Jedrzej Mackowski (2002-2004)
Justyna Dzbik (2003-2004)
Jan Szlagowski (2003-2004)
Monika Krysiak (2003-2004)
Ivo Widlak (1997-2000)

Controversies 
 The program often stirred controversies due to its liberated approach to sex and contraception.

References

Polish children's television series
1997 Polish television series debuts
2004 Polish television series endings
1990s Polish television series
2000s Polish television series
Telewizja Polska original programming